Austin Murphy (born 1985) is an Irish former hurler. At club level he played with Clara and was also a member of the Kilkenny senior hurling team. He usually lined out at midfield or as a forward.

Career

Murphy first came to prominence at juvenile and underage levels with the Clara club before eventually joining the club's top adult team. After being part of the club's All-Ireland Club Championship-winning team at intermediate level in 2013, he went on to win County Senior Championship titles in 2013 and 2015. Murphy first appeared on the inter-county scene as part of the Kilkenny team that won the All-Ireland Minor Championship title in 2003, before later winning an All-Ireland Under-21 Championship title in 2006. He was still a member of the under-21 team when he was simultaneously included on the Kilkenny intermediate and senior teams. Murphy was a non-playing substitute when Kilkenny beat Cork in the 2006 All-Ireland final.

Career statistics

Honours

Limerick Institute of Technology
Fitzgibbon Cup: 2005, 2007

Clara
Kilkenny Senior Hurling Championship: 2013 (c), 2015
All-Ireland Intermediate Club Hurling Championship: 2013
Leinster Intermediate Club Hurling Championship: 2012
Kilkenny Intermediate Hurling Championship: 2007, 2012

Kilkenny
All-Ireland Senior Hurling Championship: 2006
Leinster Senior Hurling Championship: 2006
National Hurling League: 2006
Walsh Cup: 2006
Leinster Intermediate Hurling Championship: 2006
All-Ireland Under-21 Hurling Championship: 2006
Leinster Under-21 Hurling Championship: 2005, 2006
All-Ireland Minor Hurling Championship: 2003
Leinster Minor Hurling Championship: 2003

References

1985 births
Living people
Clara hurlers
Kilkenny inter-county hurlers